Sarbine is a genus of Erebid moths, first described by Volynkin in 2019.

Species 

 Sarbine cruciata (Walker, 1862)
 Sarbine flavodiscalis (Talbot, 1926)
 Sarbine hreblayi (Volynkin & Černý, 2019)
 Sarbine siberuta (Volynkin & Černý, 2019)

References 

Moth genera
Nudariina
Moths described in 2019